Johan  was a Swedish priest and  Dominican monk. 
He served as the Bishop of Turku from 1286 to 1290 and Archbishop of Uppsala from 1290 to 1291. 

According to some sources, Johan was born in Poland, according to others in Uppsala.  Before his assignment to Turku, he worked as the prior at the Dominican monastery in Sigtuna (Sigtuna dominikankonvent). He died in Avignon while travelling to Rome to receive the pallium.

References

Other sources
Tesch, Sten (1997) Mariakyrkan i Sigtuna dominikankonvent och församlingskyrka 1247-1997    
Åsbrink, Gustav & Westman, Knut B.   (1935)Svea rikes ärkebiskopar från 1164 till nuvarande tid (Stockholm: Bokförlaget Natur och Kultur)
Paulsson, Göte (1974) Annales Suecici medii aevi (Stockholm: Gleerup)

13th-century Roman Catholic bishops in Sweden
Roman Catholic archbishops of Uppsala
Roman Catholic bishops of Turku